ABS-CBN Sports and Action (stylized as ABS-CBN Sports+Action or simply S+A or S and A), was a free-to-air television network based in Quezon City. It was owned by ABS-CBN Corporation with some of its programs produced and licensed by ABS-CBN Sports. In Metro Manila, Sports + Action broadcast terrestrially and through DTT through DWAC-TV (UHF channel 23), the frequency once used by the defunct national television network Studio 23 until its closure on January 16, 2014, with most of its UHF affiliate stations in the provinces owned by AMCARA Broadcasting Network. It began its operations on January 18, 2014, yet it did not become the company's sole channel for sports until the shutdown of subscription-based counterpart Balls by the end of 2015. Its simulcast high-definition channel was exclusively available on Sky Cable, Destiny Cable and Sky Direct since 2016, while its international feed (carried with the same channel name) carried worldwide through The Filipino Channel. Sports + Action's programming is composed primarily of sports coverage such as MPBL, ABL, UAAP, NCAA, Pinoy Pride fights, BVR, PVL and ONE Championship. The program line up of Sports + Action included other sports-related programming, news coverages and blocktimers. S+A broadcast Mondays to Saturdays from 5:00 am to 1:00 am and Sundays from 4:00 am to 1:00 am.

On May 5, 2020, the station's broadcasting activities, together with that of its sister television and radio stations ABS-CBN, DZMM, and MOR Philippines, were suspended indefinitely starting at 7:52 pm following the cease-and-desist order (CDO) issued by the National Telecommunications Commission due to the expiration of ABS-CBN's legislative license to operate. S+A continued to air internationally through The Filipino Channel until December 2, 2020.

On January 5, 2022, its former UHF frequencies (channel 23 and 43) were assigned by the NTC to Aliw Broadcasting Corporation (for channel 23) and Swara Sug Media Corporation (for channel 43).

History
According to ABS-CBN Narrowcast Head March Ventosa, the division started developing the concept of a sports channel of free television for a year. Also with its launching, the management decided to drop the strong Studio 23 branding for it is well associated with entertainment programs of which the former channel only carries 30 percent of sports related / male-dominant content.

Launching
The channel was officially launched in Glorietta 3, Ayala Center, Makati on January 16, 2014. The event was attended by several well known Filipino athletes including Marlon Stockinger, Donnie Nietes, the Philippines national football team, Jeron Teng, and some ABS-CBN executives and personalities. The event also provided a glimpse of its program lineup which includes sports coverage of UAAP, Top Rank and Pinoy Pride boxing bouts, and the Philippines national football team matches.

A test broadcast was done a day prior to its official launching on January 18, 2014.

The network's newest Station ID featuring the dedication and spirit of the Filipino athletes was launched during It's Showtime in 2014. The song "Ito ang Ating Sandali", composed and performed by former Rivermaya vocalist Rico Blanco was used for the station identification.

International feed
ABS-CBN Sports+Action was launched internationally in June 2015 via TFC, as the replacement of the BRO channel, the channel broadcast several sports coverages, programs which also aired on Channel 23 and carry-up shows including leisure, comedy and action-packed movies.

High-definition channel
On January 1, 2016, the channel launched its own high-definition feed (formerly known as Balls HD) on Sky Cable and Destiny Cable. Its program line-up included HD sports coverages of the UAAP, NCAA, Pinoy Pride, US Open, UEFA and FIVB matches. Unlike ABS-CBN HD, which was a HD simulcast feed from ABS-CBN, ABS-CBN Sports+Action HD initially was a separate channel from S+A which aired exclusive live events and other programs.

In April 2017, S+A HD converted into a HD feed simulcast channel of S+A Channel 23, similar to ABS-CBN HD.

2016 relaunch
On August 29, 2016, in time with the National Heroes Day celebration, S+A debuted its new logo and station ID campaign entitled "Sumasaludo sa Pusong Palaban ng Lahing Pilipino" or "Salute to the Defiant Heart of Filipino Generation", in line with the network's continuous advocacy on promoting sports development and supporting the Filipino athletes and sporting teams that made pride and glory to the Filipino sporting community and its values and hardwork. The song "Tibay", performed by singer/songwriter Quest, was used in the station ID, which featured athletes from the sports coverages covered by ABS-CBN Sports+Action, such as UAAP, NCAA, boxing and MMA events.

Beginning August 2018, S+A began to broadcast 24 hours of sports coverage a day similar to the national ABS-CBN, in which however, only for selected sports programs that aired on early mornings.

2020 franchise renewal issue

On May 5, 2020, the National Telecommunications Commission issued a cease and desist order against ABS-CBN Corporation, forcing all of its television stations, including S+A, to suspend their operations immediately due to the expiration of its legislative franchise. But some S+A Programs were moved through its cable and satellite channel Liga as ad interim.

TV Patrol's special episode dedicated to the cease-and-desist order of ABS-CBN's free TV and radio stations was the final show to be aired on S+A before the network signed off indefinitely.

S+A Global closure 
After five years, S+A Global ceased its broadcast operations internationally through The Filipino Channel on December 2, 2020, due to implementation of a retrenchment program covering its business company from August 7, following the House of Representatives' 70–11 vote denying the company a fresh congressional franchise on July 10, 2020 and the dissolution of ABS-CBN Sports to close its business effective August 31, 2020.

Programming

According to Sports Interactive Network, S+A's programming line-up comprised by 70 percent of its contents will be about sports, with the remaining of it covering Filipino action films, news updates, and other entertainment, informative & religious programs such as blocktimers. Several programming of the now-defunct Balls channel (which ended transmission on December 31, 2015) were absorbed by S+A. However, all movie blocks, news updates and other action-related programs including US drama series were phased out in April 2017 in favor of additional sports coverages.

See also
 ABS-CBN Corporation
 ABS-CBN Sports
 ABS-CBN News and Current Affairs
 AMCARA Broadcasting Network
 Liga

References

ABS-CBN Sports and Action
Defunct television networks in the Philippines
Sports television networks in the Philippines
Television channels and stations established in 2014
Assets owned by ABS-CBN Corporation
Filipino-language television stations
2014 establishments in the Philippines
Television channels and stations disestablished in 2020
2020 disestablishments in the Philippines
ABS-CBN Corporation channels